Raccoo-oo-oon was an experimental noise rock/psychedelic rock quartet from Iowa.

Their first release was a self-issued cassette entitled Is Night People, which was reissued by Swedish label Release the Bats, (see Allmusic).

The members of the group were Andy Spore (vocals, electronics, percussion and saxophone), Daren Ho (vocals, guitar and electronics), Ryan Garbes (percussion and electronics) and Shawn Reed (vocals, guitar, electronics and percussion).

In 2012 guitarist Daren Ho opened Control Synthesizers and Electronic Devices in Brooklyn, NY with Jonas Asher.

Style
Their style of music has been described as "tribal-like percussions", "raw and impetuous – characterised by seemingly-improvised saxophone freak-outs and crashing percussion with an emphasis on chaos".

Discography
2005 - Is Night People Cassette
2005 - Mythos Folkways No. 1 LP
2006 - Mythos Folkways Vol. No. 2: Pre-American Lands (Raccoo-oo-oon & Woods Split) LP
2006 - Bored Fortress (Raccoo-oo-oon & Sword Heaven Split) LP
2006 - The Cave of Spirits Forever
2006 - Death at Prospect Peak Cassette
2006 - Mythos Folkways Vol. 3: Divination Night Cassette
2007 - Behold Secret Kingdom LP
2007 - "Raccoo-oo-oon" 7"
2008 - Mythos Folkways Vol. IV: Future Vision Cassette
2008 - Mythos Folkways Vol. V: Future Vision Cassette
2008 - Raccoo-oo-oon 2 LP

References

External links
 Release The Bats Records
 Release The Bats Myspace

American experimental musical groups
American psychedelic rock music groups
Musical groups established in 2004
Rock music groups from Iowa